Elio Motors is a company founded by Paul Elio in 2009, to design and manufacture a three-wheeled, enclosed autocycle. 

Since the 2009 conception, the company illustrated and repeatedly delayed a release date for its original gasoline powered vehicle, pivoted to an electric powered concept, collected an estimated $28 million of deposits, has been fined $7.5 million for failing to create promised jobs in Louisiana — and as of May 2022 has not neared production.

As early as 2015, The New York Times noted Elio Motors was selling "spots on the waiting list — and, more broadly, a dream."

Concept
Based on a host of speculative forward-looking statements, the company's gas-powered three-wheel concept was marketed as the Elio P4; was illustrated to attain a highway mileage rating of up to 84 mpg and was to offer power windows, a power door lock, cruise control, and air conditioning, in an aerodynamic, enclosed bodywork. The design idea included multiple air bags, anti-lock brakes, traction control, steel unibody frame, and crumple zones and a three-wheeled autocycle configuration with two wheels in front, one in back. Advertisements in 2017 illustrated a base price target of $7,450 for the gas motor version and suggested to achieve up to 84 mpg-US (2.8 L/100 km) on the highway and up to 49 in the city.

As of June 2017, basic test mules and three validation vehicles (codenamed: E1-A, E1-C, and E1-D) were built to test safety, aerodynamics, and durability. Even though the E1-C is not used for testing, it was the most up-to-date interior with a cosmetically evolved engine. Elio claimed the autocycle could be produced using 80% soft-tooling. Elio's marketing suggested that 100 pre-production fleet vehicles could be built at its Shreveport, Louisiana manufacturing facility if additional funds are secured.

The vehicle's design was illustrated to include air conditioning and heating (projected to be manufactured by RedDOT), AM/FM stereo, power windows/door lock, cruise control, three airbags, a reinforced steel roll cage, side intrusion beams, stability control, and disc brakes with ABS. Continental AG has designed a tire specifically for the Elio.

Elio designs could meet motorcycle standards as a three-wheeled autocycle, within the U.S. government's motorcycle classification. The company lobbied in most states, to alter regulations that would otherwise require drivers to wear a helmet and, in many states to remove the requirement for operators to have a motorcycle endorsement on their driver license.

The trunk space is designed to be 27 × 14 × 10 inches, enough for one airline carry-on bag or golf bag with the rear seat folded down (47+ inches).

In September 2021, Elio Motors announced that a new electric motor design was the company's focus, to be later followed by a gas motor option. The projections, which did not include range, cited a possible $15,000 price.

Illustrated production

Elio Motors is based in Phoenix, Arizona, and projected in 2017 that manufacturing could take place at a facility in Shreveport, Louisiana, using a portion of the former General Motors 3.2 million-square-foot plant. Production would have employed upwards of 1,500 people at the Shreveport facility plus an additional 1,500 at the supply base, but will not be occurring. In addition, Elio Motors projected that 90% of parts for its vehicle could originate in North America.

The idea of 100 pre-production fleet vehicles was teased in December 2016, however social media replies on Nov 1, 2017, from Elio Motors said, "We are targeting the start of production in 2019". The potential service provider for Elio Motors is Pep Boys. The company started accepting customer reservations on its website in January 2013 and stopped accepting reservations at 65,341 in 2017. On August 3, 2017, Elio filed with the U.S. Securities and Exchange Commission to have an initial public offering (IPO) for its common stock in order to raise $100 million in capital. In the filing, it said that their vehicle would not be capable of production until approximately 76 weeks after securing enough funding to begin.

Criticism
Elio Motors has continuously delayed the release date, which was originally in 2012. Since then, the date has been pushed back each year. In December 2016, the date was announced to have moved to 2018, and on Nov 1, 2017 in a Facebook reply, Elio Motors mentioned the start of production aimed for 2019. These dates have made automotive analysts question the company's ability to bring a product to market. Critics have drawn comparisons to the Lit Motors C-1 and Aptera Motors, which had similar production schemes requiring more funding than was attainable, while updating production timelines to give the impression that a product was deliverable.

Elio's own estimate was that an investment of  plus an additional  in reservation deposits would be necessary in order to go into production. Throughout 2018 and beyond, reservation deposits remained closed, and there was no concrete plan in place to raise the nearly half-billion dollars to proceed. Despite a lack of transparency as to their path forward, Elio announced a December 2019 production date, which passed with no progress.

In January 2019, Elio stated: "The production date is estimated to be 76 weeks from the timely and successful completion of our current and subsequent fundraising efforts. The timing and availability of the funds can move and we will do everything we can to keep the project moving forward by utilizing each piece of funding received, as we receive it."

This lack of an actual product over a near-decade long span has caused critics to call their car vaporware.

The Elio web site blog and press release areas were not updated between December 2019 and September 9, 2021, when a redesigned website emerged and announced the company's intention to produce an electric motor version of their three-wheeled vehicle at double the cost.  The Elio Motors Facebook page was similarly left without updates between April 2019 and September 9, 2021.

See also
Nobe GT100
Microlino
William Garrison (geographer) – studied concept of narrow vehicles
List of motorized trikes
Three-wheeler
Twentieth Century Motor Car Corporation
Vaporware

References

External links

Elio Motors took millions in customer deposits...never delivered

Vehicle manufacturing companies established in 2009
2009 establishments in Arizona
Manufacturing companies based in Phoenix, Arizona
Car manufacturers of the United States
Three-wheeled motor vehicles
Compact cars
Front-wheel-drive vehicles
Car brands
Companies traded over-the-counter in the United States